Osmi nervni slom (trans. Eighth Nervous Breakdown) is the seventh studio album released by Serbian and former Yugoslav rock band Riblja Čorba in 1986.

The album was produced by Kornelije Kovač, who also played keyboards on the album recording.  The song "Amsterdam" featured British reggae musician Eddy Grant on vocals. The ballad "Prokleto sam" featured actress Ana Kostovska on backing vocals. "Jedan čovek" featured Jova Maljoković on saxophone.

The album was polled in 1998 as the 83rd on the list of 100 greatest Yugoslav rock and pop albums in the book YU 100: najbolji albumi jugoslovenske rok i pop muzike (YU 100: The Best albums of Yugoslav pop and rock music).

Album cover
The album cover was designed by Vladeta Andrić, and is one of two Riblja Čorba album covers which were not designed by Jugoslav Vlahović (the other one being Koza nostra cover).

Track listing

Personnel
Bora Đorđević - vocals
Vidoja Božinović - guitar
Nikola Čuturilo - guitar
Miša Aleksić - bass guitar
Vicko Milatović - drums

Guest musicians
Eddy Grant - vocals (on "Amsterdam")
Ana Kostovska - backing vocals (on "Prokleto sam")
Jova Maljoković - saxophone (on "Jedan čovek")

Additional personnel
Kornelije Kovač - keyboards, producer
Tahir Duraklić - recorded by

References

Osmi nervni slom at Discogs
 EX YU ROCK enciklopedija 1960-2006,  Janjatović Petar;

External links
Osmi nervni slom at Discogs

Riblja Čorba albums
1986 albums
PGP-RTB albums